League One or League 1 may refer to:

Association football 

 EFL League One, the third tier of football in England.
 China League One, the second tier of football in China
 K League 1, the top-tier football in South Korea
 League1 British Columbia, semi-professional regional league in Canada
 League1 Ontario, semi-professional regional league in Canada
 League1 Ontario (women), semi-professional women's regional league in Canada
 Scottish League One, the third tier of football in Scotland
 Thai League 1, the top tier of football in Thailand
 USL League One, a third-tier soccer league in the United States

Rugby 

 RFL League 1, the third tier of rugby league in Europe
 National League 1, the third tier of rugby union in England

See also 

 Ligue 1, the top tier professional football league in France